Madeleine Moon (born 27 March 1950) is a British Labour Party politician, who was the Member of Parliament (MP) for Bridgend from 2005 to 2019, when she lost her seat to the Welsh Conservative candidate Jamie Wallis.

Early life 
Born in North East England, Madeleine attended Whinney Hill Secondary Modern Girls' School (now part of Durham Johnston Comprehensive School) then Durham Girls' Grammar School (became the sixth form of Durham Gilesgate Sports College and Sixth Form Centre). She went to Madeley College of Education (later part of North Staffordshire Polytechnic), gaining a Cert Ed in 1971, then Keele University, where she gained a BEd in 1972. From University College, Cardiff she gained a CQSW and Diploma in Social Work (DipSW) in 1980.

She worked in social services for Mid Glamorgan County Council from 1980 to 1996, then for Swansea Council from 1996 to 2002.

She launched Crossroads (a charity that supports carers) in Porthcawl. She represented Bridgend Council on the Sports Council for Wales, on Tourism South and West Wales and was National Chair of the British Resorts Association from 1999 to 2001.

Parliamentary career 
Moon has lived and worked around Bridgend for over 29 years, is a former mayor of Porthcawl and was a councillor for Porthcawl for 13 years. She was elected MP for the Bridgend constituency at the 2005 general election.

Madeleine Moon was Parliamentary Private Secretary (PPS) to Lord Drayson, Minister for Science in the Department for Science, Innovation and Skills.

In 2007 and 2008, Moon received a higher public profile due to an increased number of suicides of young people in her constituency. She agreed with South Wales Police that the suicides are not connected but has been critical of media coverage.

Madeleine Moon has written and spoken extensively on prison reform and policing. In 2014 she called for the armed forces to overhaul their policies on investigating bullying.

She supported Owen Smith in the failed attempt to replace Jeremy Corbyn in the 2016 Labour leadership election.

In November 2018 she was elected in Halifax, Nova Scotia as President of the NATO Parliamentary Assembly. She also became a member of the UK Delegation to the Assembly in 2010.

She stood in the 2019 general election but lost her seat to Conservative Jamie Wallis.

Expenses
The Daily Telegraph, which extensively covered MPs' expenses during the United Kingdom parliamentary expenses scandal, reported that Moon had claimed for furniture items bought near her primary residence in Wales; claims are allowed for her second home in London but not for her primary residence in Wales. She said that the furniture, though bought in Wales, was indeed for her second home in London.

Personal life
She married the ecologist Steve Moon in 1983 in Ogwr, Mid Glamorgan; the couple had one son David, born in May 1984. Her husband died in March 2015.

References

External links
 Madeleine Moon MP official constituency website
Madeleine Moon MP Welsh Labour Party profile

News articles
 Shopping for furniture in May 2009
 Furniture expenses in May 2009
 Meet the MP in November 2005
Audio clips
 Suicides in February 2008
Video clips
 
 

1950 births
Living people
Welsh Labour Party MPs
Female members of the Parliament of the United Kingdom for Welsh constituencies
Members of Bridgend County Borough Council
People from Sunderland
Politicians from Tyne and Wear
People from Durham, England
Mayors of places in Wales
Alumni of Keele University
Alumni of Cardiff University
English social workers
Women mayors of places in Wales
English women in politics
Politics of Bridgend County Borough
21st-century British women politicians
UK MPs 2005–2010
UK MPs 2010–2015
UK MPs 2015–2017
UK MPs 2017–2019
21st-century English women
21st-century English people
Women councillors in Wales